Stirtonia is an extinct genus of New World monkeys from the Middle Miocene (Laventan in the South American land mammal ages; 13.8 to 11.8 Ma). Its remains have been found at the Konzentrat-Lagerstätte of La Venta in the Honda Group of Colombia. Two species have been described, S. victoriae and the type species S. tatacoensis. Synonyms are Homunculus tatacoensis, described by Ruben Arthur Stirton in 1951 and Kondous laventicus by Setoguchi in 1985. The genus is classified in Alouattini as an ancestor to the modern howler monkeys.

Etymology 
Stirtonia is named after the scientist who first discovered it, Ruben Arthur Stirton. The two species, S. tatcoensis and S. victoriae, are named after the locations in which they were found: S. tatacoensis gets its name from the Tatacoa desert; and S. victoriae gets its name from the village “La Victoria” near its discovery site.

Description 
Stirtonia tatacoensis and S. victoriae are known by several teeth, a mandible and a maxilla that closely resemble, and are almost indistinguishable from, the living Alouatta.

Fossil teeth found in the Solimões Formation at the Acre River in the border region of Brazil and Peru may belong to Stirtonia.

Fossil record 
A lower mandible fossil of S. tatacoensis was discovered during fieldwork between 1944 and 1949, in the Honda Group, that has been dated to the Laventan, about 13 Ma.

Upper jaws and other cranial material of the large primate Stirtonia victoriae from the Perico Member of the La Dorada Formation, Honda Group were discovered in 1985 and 1986.

Evolution 

The evolutionary split between Atelidae, of which Stirtonia, and Pitheciidae plus Callicebus, has been placed at 17.0 million years ago.

Habitat 

The Honda Group, and more precisely the "Monkey Beds", are the richest site for fossil primates in South America. It has been argued that the monkeys of the Honda Group were living in habitat that was in contact with the Amazon and Orinoco Basins, and that La Venta itself was probably seasonally dry forest. From the same level as where Stirtonia tatacoensis has been found, also fossils of Aotus dindensis, Micodon, Mohanamico, Saimiri annectens, Saimiri fieldsi and Cebupithecia have been uncovered. Stirtonia reinforced the notion that leaf-eating was an
enduring and essential aspect of the howler monkey's ecophylogenetic biology.

See also 

 List of primates of Colombia
 Miocallicebus
 Mohanamico

References

Bibliography

Further reading 
 
 

Prehistoric primate genera
Prehistoric monkeys
Miocene genus first appearances
Miocene extinctions
Miocene primates of South America
Laventan
Neogene Colombia
Fossils of Colombia
Honda Group, Colombia
Neogene Brazil
Fossils of Brazil
Fossil taxa described in 1970